A Night at the Movies is a short film starring Robert Benchley.  It was Benchley's greatest success since How to Sleep, and won him a contract for more short films that would be produced in New York.

The film was nominated for an Academy Award at the 10th Academy Awards, held in 1937, for Best Short Subject (One-Reel).

References

External links 

1937 comedy films
1937 films
American black-and-white films
Metro-Goldwyn-Mayer short films
Films directed by Roy Rowland
1937 short films
American comedy short films
1930s English-language films
1930s American films